Thorpe Underwood is a settlement and (as Thorpe Underwoods) a civil parish about  north of York, in the Harrogate district, in the county of North Yorkshire, England. In 2011 the parish had a population of 793. The parish touches Aldwark, Green Hammerton, Kirby Hall, Linton-on-Ouse, Little Ouseburn, Nun Monkton and Whixley. Thorpe Underwoods shares a parish council with Little Ouseburn and Kirby Hall called "Little Ouseburn Grouped Parish Council".

Landmarks 
There are nine listed buildings in Thorpe Underwoods.

History 
The name "Thorpe" means 'Outlying farm/settlement'. Thorpe Underwood was recorded in the Domesday Book as Tuadestorp. Thorpe Green was recorded as being a hamlet in the township of Thorpe Underwood, it is where the modern Thorpe Underwood hamlet is. Thorpe Underwoods was formerly a township in the parish of Little Ouseburn, in 1866 Thorpe Underwoods became a civil parish in its own right.

References 

Villages in North Yorkshire
Civil parishes in North Yorkshire
Borough of Harrogate